A mudbrick or mud-brick is an air-dried brick, made of a mixture of mud (containing loam, clay, sand and water) mixed with a binding material such as rice husks or straw. Mudbricks are known from 9000 BCE.

Since around 5000–4000 BCE, mudbricks evolved into fired bricks to increase strength and durability. Nevertheless, in some warm regions with very little timber available to fuel a kiln, mudbricks continued to be in use. Until today, mudbricks are the standard of vernacular architecture in some warmer regions mainly in parts of Africa and western Asia. In the 20th century, the compressed earth block was developed using high pressure as a cheap and eco-friendly alternative to obtain non-fired bricks with more strength than the simpler air-dried mudbricks.

Ancient world

The history of mudbrick production and construction in the southern Levant may be dated as far back to the Pre-Pottery Neolithic A (e.g., PPNA Jericho). These sun dried mudbricks, also known as adobe or just mudbrick, were made from a mixture of sand, clay, water and frequently tempered (e.g. chopped straw and chaff branches), and were the most common method/material for constructing earthen buildings throughout the ancient Near East for millennia. Unfired mud-brick is still made throughout the world today, using both modern and traditional methods.

The 9000 BCE dwellings of Jericho were constructed from mudbricks, affixed with mud, as would those at  numerous sites across the Levant over the following millennia. Well-preserved mudbricks from a site at Tel Tsaf, in the Jordan Valley, have been dated to 5200 BCE, though there is no evidence that either site was the first to use the technology. Evidence suggests that the mudbrick composition at Tel Tsaf was stable for at least 500 years, throughout the middle Chalcolithic period.

The South Asian inhabitants of Mehrgarh constructed and lived in mud-brick houses between 7000–3300 BCE. Mud bricks were used at more than 15 reported sites attributed to the 3rd millennium BCE in the ancient Indus Valley civilization. In the Mature Harappan phase fired bricks were used. 

The Mesopotamians used sun-dried bricks in their city construction;  typically these bricks were flat on the bottom and curved on the top, called plano-convex mud bricks. Some were formed in a square mould and rounded so that the middle was thicker than the ends.  Some walls had a few courses of fired bricks from their bases up to the splash line to extend the life of the building.

In Minoan Crete, at the Knossos site, there is archaeological evidence that sun-dried bricks were used in the Neolithic period (prior to 3400 BCE).

Sun dried mudbrick was the most common construction material employed in ancient Egypt during pharaonic times and were made in pretty much the same way for millennia. Mud from some locations required sand, chopped straw or other binders such as animal dung to be mixed in with the mud to increase durability and plasticity. Workers gathered mud from the Nile river and poured it into a pit. Workers then tramped on the mud while straw was added to solidify the mold. The mudbricks were chemically suitable as fertilizer, leading to the destruction of many ancient Egyptian ruins, such as at Edfu. A well-preserved site is Amarna. Mudbrick use increased at the time of Roman influence.

In the Ancient Greek world, mudbrick was commonly used for the building of walls, fortifications and citadels, such as the walls of the Citadel of Troy (Troy II). These mudbricks were often made with straw or dried vegetable matter.

Adobe

In areas of Spanish influence, mud-brick construction is called adobe, and developed over time into a complete system of wall protection, flat roofing and finishes which in modern English usage is often referred to as adobe style, regardless of the construction method.

Banco

The Great Mosque of Djenné, in central Mali, is the world's largest mudbrick structure. It, like much of Sahelian architecture, is built with a mudbrick called Banco, a recipe of mud and grain husks, fermented, and either formed into bricks or applied on surfaces as a plaster like paste in broad strokes. This plaster must be reapplied annually.

Durability
In some cases, brickmakers extended the life of mud bricks by putting fired bricks on top or covering them with stucco.

Mudbrick architecture worldwide

See also

Notes

References
 Possehl, Gregory L. (1996). Mehrgarh in Oxford Companion to Archaeology, edited by Brian Fagan. Oxford University Press.

External links
Earth Architecture, website whose focus is contemporary issues in earth architecture.
EARTHA: Earth Architecture and Conservation in East Anglia, British organisation that focuses on the proper maintenance and conservation of earth buildings in a region of the UK that has a long history of building with mud. Very experienced experts are contactable and there are regular demonstrations in the area.
Video showing mud brick making, mud brick building and biolytic sewerage in South Africa.
CRAterre: Centre de recherche architectural en terre, French university research organisation dedicated to unfired earth construction

Bricks
Sustainable building
Appropriate technology
Sustainable products
Soil-based building materials
Pre-Pottery Neolithic A